Bamingui-Bangoran is one of the 16 prefectures of the Central African Republic. It covers an area of 58,200 km² and had a population of 38,437 as of the 2003 census. The population density of 0.66/km² is the lowest in the country. The capital is Ndélé.

The Bamingui-Bangoran National Park and Biosphere Reserve is in the prefecture.

Bamingui

Towns and villages 

Ancien Village de Gara
Ancien Village Ngouassa
Bakolekpa
Balouba
Balouba Yakandjia
Bamingui
Bandeve
Bangoran
Bingou
Bissingou
Boufoura
Boumbala
Dacpa Mindou
Dangavo
Dangou Badouma
Digba
Elle
Grand Elan
Kaga Nze
Kaka
Koukourou
Koutessako
Kouya Koundou
Kovongo Mia
Maikaba
Miafondo
Ngoussoua
Nianga Bitibanda
Niango Amane
Sakoumba
Vata
Yambala
Yambala Koudouvele
Yangou Birolo
Yangou Gala
Yangou Gongo
Yangoulika
Yombo

Ndele

Towns and villages 

 Abou-Ndoulaf, Akourousoulba
 Aliou
 Bakolekpa, Ndele
 Bandjipreu
 Bangbali
 Bangbali-Outmane
 Bavoko
 Bilinguili
 Bir-Batouma Moussa
 Bolo
 Botedjo
 Boul-Kinia
 Campement de Mialouto
 Demi Batchi
 Deo
 Diki
 Djabossinda
 Djamassinda
 Dongo
 Doum
 Gaita Mainda
 Galo
 Garba
 Gbetihindjou
 Godere
 Godovo
 Golongoso
 Gondo
 Gou Mbre
 Goumindou
 Gounda
 Gouyambri
 Goz Amar
 Goz Beida
 Idongo
 Kadekadjia
 Kaga-Doumba
 Kaligne-Souleyman
 Kassena Souleyman
 Kenouzou
 Kilibiti
 Kolo
 Kori
 Koubou
 Koudi
 Koundi
 Koutchikako
 Koutoukaye
 Kouyara
 Kpakpale
 Krakoma
 Lazanguere
 Lemena
 Lokotoumala
 Manegoto
 Manga
 Manovo
 Mbala
 Mbolo
 Mbolo Abetlanga
 Mialouto
 Miamere
 Miamete Adoum
 Mindou
 Ndagra
 N'Délé
 Ndire
 Ngoudjaka
 Ngoudro
 Ngouga
 Ngoumbiri
 Ngoussoua
 Ngoussoua Campement
 Njoko
 Ouihi
 Ouihi-Goutehoko
 Pata
 Rokone al Arab
 Sokoumba
 Takara
 Tiri
 Tolisso
 Vougba
 Voungba
 Yaffo
 Yangou Birlo
 Yangou Brindji
 Yangou Ndarsa
 Zoukoutoumiala
 Zoukoutouniala

References 

 
Prefectures of the Central African Republic